Sedum eriocarpum, the purple stonecrop, is a small, annual, succulent herb, 3–6 cm high, with hairless, reddish-green stems. Leaves succulent, simple, entire, spirally arranged, hairless, stalkless, elliptical to oblong, 3–15 x 2–8 mm, green or green-reddish. Flowers actinomorphic, petals white with purplish keel. It flowers from March to May and the fruit is a follicle.

Distribution and habitat
Sedum eriocarpum has been recorded in southern Greece, Turkey, the Levant and the islands of the eastern Mediterranean. It is found on rocky and stony hillsides on limestone formations at 0–600 m altitude.

References

External links
 http://www.treknature.com/gallery/photo257160.htm
 http://www.treknature.com/gallery/photo251363.htm
 http://floraofcyprus.zzl.org/images/sedum porphyreum/DSC04488.JPG
 http://www.moa.gov.cy/moa/fd/fd.nsf/0/E35E238470AE526AC22577AB0026BECE/$file/Sedum porphyreum-1.jpg?OpenElement
 http://www.theplantlist.org/tpl1.1/record/kew-2489439

porphyreum